was a Japanese swimmer. He competed in two events at the 1924 Summer Olympics.

References

External links
 

1905 births
Year of death missing
Japanese male backstroke swimmers
Japanese male breaststroke swimmers
Olympic swimmers of Japan
Swimmers at the 1924 Summer Olympics
Place of birth missing